Stevan Larner was a cinematographer and winemaker known for such films as Badlands, The Buddy Holly Story, Caddyshack and Steelyard Blues.

References

External links

1930 births
2005 deaths
American cinematographers
American winemakers
Emmy Award winners